Samantha Arellano Duron (born 21 August 1995) is a Mexican professional footballer who currently plays as a midfielder for Club Tijuana (women) in the Liga MX Femenil.

Early life 
Born in Tijuana, Mexico, Samantha Arellano attended San Ysidro High School in San Diego, California where she became two-time South Bay League Champion under the coaching of Kristina Hernandez and Julio Diaz from 2009 to 2013. During her time with the San Ysidro cougars, Arellano became the top scoring soccer player for the women's soccer team registering 96 goals during her four years of varsity soccer. Arellano was recognized as MVP her sophomore, junior, and senior year by her team and the South Bay League Conference and won All-Conference Academic honors.

Arellano also played for the San Diego United club from 2011 to 2013. During her time with the club, Arellano participated in the 2012 FIFA U-17 Women's World Cup representing Mexico Women's National Under-17 football team. After her participation, Samantha Arellano was offered to be part of the UC Riverside Highlanders Women's Soccer team to compete in the NCAA Division I Big West Conference intercollegiate competition.

University 
Arellano began her participation with the UC Riverside Highlanders Women's Soccer team in 2013 where she saw her first action and first start in the team's season-opening, 3-2 loss to UNLV. Later on she picked up her first assist on a goal against San Jose State University on August 25, 2013. During the Big West Conference, Arellano recorded a goal and an assist in the 3-1 victory over California State University, Northridge, scored the only goal in the 3-1 loss to California Polytechnic State University, and finished second on the team in points, goals and assists. The Big West named her to the All-Conference Honorable Mention Team, while College Sports Madness named her to the All-Conference, Second Team. During her sophomore year, College Sports Madness named her to the Big West Preseason All-Conference First Team, scored goals in the Highlanders first two matches of the season—a 3-0 victory over Grand Canyon University and a 4-2 win over Northern Arizona University—and was named to the Big West All-Academic Team. In Arellano's third season with the highlanders, she recorded the first multi-goal match of her collegiate career in a 2-0 victory at the University of South Dakota and was named to the Big West All-Academic Team. Arellano finished up her college soccer in 2016 leaving with two assists in the 3-0 victory against the University of Houston. By June 2017, she completed a Bachelor of Arts (B.A.) in Psychology, from the University of California, Riverside.

Playing career 
The Liga MX Femenil began its foundation in 2017 and Arellano was one of the many players who pioneered in the league and has been playing since then. She began her professional soccer career with Club Tijuana in July 2017 after debuting against Club America in Mexico City, Mexico.

Club Tijuana

In July 2017, Samantha Arellano debuted her career against Club America and played full ninety minutes of the first match for both teams. Arellano participated in three tournaments with the team from 2017 to 2018 registering four goals after her third season. She scored her first professional career goal against C.F Pachuca September 30, 2017 at Estadio Caliente. Arellano came back to Club Tijuana in 2020 and has been a member of the team since then.

Club America

After her third tournament with Club Tijuana, Arellano signed with Club America in Mexico City, Mexico for the 2019 season and was part of the team from January 2019 - June 2020.

References 

 https://www.ligafemenil.mx/cancha/jugador/125291/eyJpZENsdWIiOiAxMTE4MH0=/samantha-arellano-duron
 https://www.maxpreps.com/athlete/samantha-arellano/ah9bp_TmEeKZ5AAmVebBJg/girls-soccer/stats.htm
 https://gohighlanders.com/sports/womens-soccer/roster/sammy-arellano/4406

External links 
 

1995 births
Living people
Mexican women's footballers
Liga MX Femenil players
Women's association football midfielders
UC Riverside Highlanders women's soccer players